Malumu ni Tobu kei Naivaukura also known as Malumu ni Tobu in short is a Fijian music band based in Fiji. Jiosefata Veitaukula is the lead singer. One of its songs, "Rosi Ni Waisiliva", was nominated at the 2017 Fiji Performing Rights Association Music Awards.

Awards and nominations

Fiji Performing Rights Association Music Awards

Procera Music Awards

Discography

Album
2008: R.K.S Vol. 1 
2009: Yali Na Dina Vol. 2 
2010: Au Sega Ni Kila Vol. 3 
2011: Velavela Dina Vol. 4 
2012: Sa sevi koso na senikau Vol. 
2013: Taqiri Tu Na Lali Vol. 6
2014: Noqu I Tau Vol. 7
2016: Domo Kamica Kei Nasau Vol. 8 with Savu Ni Delai Lomai
2016: Rosi Ni Waisiliva Vol. 8 
2017: Na Dina Vol. 9

Members 
Jiosefa Vetaukula
Savenaca Nukucebuya
Laisiasa Koroi
Josaia Vetaukula

See also
 Fiji Performing Rights Association
 Procera Music

References

External links
 Malumu ni Tobu kei Naivaukurak

Fijian musical groups
Fijian musicians
People from Koro Island